Comitas suratensis is a species of sea snail, a marine gastropod mollusc in the family Pseudomelatomidae, the turrids and allies.

Distribution
This marine species occurs off Sumatra, Indonesia.

References

  Thiele J., 1925. Gastropoden der Deutschen Tiefsee-Expedition. In:. Wissenschaftliche Ergebnisse der Deutschen Tiefsee-Expedition auf dem Dampfer "Valdivia" 1898–1899  II. Teil, vol. 17, No. 2, Gustav Fischer, Berlin

External links
 

suratensis
Gastropods described in 1925